Copper naproxen is a chemical complex of copper2+ chelated with the anti-inflammatory drug  naproxen. Copper complexes of NSAIDs like naproxen have been shown to have greater anti-inflammatory properties than the base drug.

Copper naproxen can by found as a monohydrate, and it can form complexes with other organic molecules such as nicotinyl alcohol, 3-methylpyridine, and caffeine.

Preparation 
Copper naproxen is prepared by reacting sodium naproxen with a copper(II) salt such as copper(II) sulfate.

2C14H13NaO3 + CuSO4 -> C28H26CuO6 + Na2SO4

References 

Copper(II) compounds
Experimental drugs